Ushirombo is a town in the Geita Region in northwestern Tanzania. The town is the location of the district headquarters for Bukombe District. In 2016, its population was 95,052.

References

Populated places in Geita Region
Populated places in Tanzania